"" is the 36th single by Zard and released 9 July 2003 under B-Gram Records label. The single debuted at #4 rank first week. It charted for 7 weeks and sold over 44,000 copies.

Track list
All songs are written by Izumi Sakai

composer: Aika Ohno/arrangement: Akihito Tokunaga
the song was used in Fuji TV program Sport! as theme song

composer: Yuuichirou Iwai (U-ka Saegusa in dB)/arrangement: Yoshinobu Ohga
 (original karaoke)

References

2003 singles
Zard songs
2003 songs
Songs written by Izumi Sakai
Songs written by Aika Ohno